Autumn, Again is the third studio album by American indie rock band A Sunny Day in Glasgow. It was self-released by the band on October 19, 2010 as a free digital download, as well as on LP in a limited run of 500 copies.

Background
A Sunny Day in Glasgow recorded the songs on Autumn, Again at various locations in Australia, Europe and the United States from 2008 to 2010. The songs were originally composed by the band for their previous album Ashes Grammar (2009), but ultimately did not make the final track listing for that album.

Track listing

Personnel
Credits are adapted from the album's digital notes.

A Sunny Day in Glasgow
 Ben Daniels
 Annie Fredrickson
 Jen Goma
 Adam Herndon
 Josh Meakim
 Ryan Newmyer

Production
 Ben Daniels – mixing, recording
 Thomas Kee – mastering
 Josh Meakim – mixing, recording

Design
 Naomi Donabedian – design, layout
 Edvard Munch – cover artwork

References

External links
 

2010 albums
A Sunny Day in Glasgow albums
Albums recorded in a home studio
Self-released albums